Euryleonis (Flourished c. 370 BC, Sparta, ancient Greece) was a celebrated woman, owner of a chariot-winner of Olympic games.

Euryleonis was a horse breeder from Sparta whose horse chariot won the two horse chariot races of the Ancient Olympic Games in 368 BC. She is sometimes referred to as a princess and wealthy woman.

Euryleonis was only the second female stephanite (crown-bearer) in the long Olympic history. Twenty-four years earlier, her predecessor, the Spartan princess Kyniska, had won the four horse race in 396 BCE and again in 392 BCE, the first ever woman to win at the Olympics. Women could not participate in Ancient Olympic games personally and even being a viewer was under strict prohibition for them, with punishment by death. The only possibility of participating and winning for a woman was to be an owner of a chariot and horses in chariot races, because just the owner, not the driver, recognized as a winner of races.

Bronze statue 
According to the Greek travel writer Pausanias (flourished 143–176 CE), a statue of Euryleonis was erected at Sparta c. 368 BCE It is one of few bronze statues that survives anywhere in the Greek world, and in writing there are no personal statues of athletic or military victors in Sparta before the statue of Euryleonis. According to the Lacedaemonians, the statue of Euryleonis was located near the Skenôma, or tent. Another writer also described the statue as being near a tent, which has been suggested to be the small building mentioned by Thukydides as the place where King Pausanias took refuge. It is also said that the statue stood in the temple of Aphrodite in Sparta.

References

Bibliography

4th-century BC Spartans
4th-century BC Greek women
Ancient Olympic competitors
Ancient Spartan women
Sportswomen in antiquity